The Denel Vektor GA-1 is an automatic cannon based on the German WW II MG 151/20 automatic cannon using 20x82mm Mauser cartridge resulting in light recoil and weight 20mm rapid fire autocannon suitable for vehicles, naval vessels and helicopters. One gun was fitted to the Atlas XH-1 Alpha attack helicopter demonstrator.

References

Autocannon
Cold War weapons of South Africa
20 mm artillery